The women's doubles wheelchair tennis competition at the 1996 Summer Paralympics in Atlanta from 16 August until 25 August.

Draw

Key
 INV = Bipartite invitation
 IP = ITF place
 ALT = Alternate
 r = Retired
 w/o = Walkover

Finals

Top half

Bottom half

References 
 

Women's doubles
Para